Milton Cardona (November 21, 1944 – September 19, 2014) was a percussionist, vocalist and conga player from Mayagüez, Puerto Rico.

Milton Cardona made well over 1000 recordings, nine of which won Grammies. His career and was highly influenced by Mongo Santamaria. He studied violin during his childhood in The Bronx, New York, and played bass guitar professionally in New York City as a youth before playing percussion. He collaborated with Kip Hanrahan, Spike Lee, Paul Simon, Willie Colón, David Byrne, Cachao, Larry Harlow, Eddie Palmieri, Don Byron, Celia Cruz, Guaco, Hector Lavoe, Ned Rothenberg, Rabih Abou-Khalil and Jack Bruce from the rock band Cream. He died on September 19, 2014, from heart failure.

Early life
His family moved to the South Bronx, from Mayaguez, when he was 5 years old. He was a santero, a priest of Santería.

Selected discography
 Beautiful Scars (2007)
 Bembé (1985)
 Cambucha (1999)
 Cosa Nuestra (1969)
 Rei Momo (1989)
 Songs from The Capeman (1997)
 Tenderness (1990)
With Rabih Abou-Khalil
Blue Camel (Enja, 1992)
The Sultan's Picnic (Enja, 1994)
With Uri Caine
The Goldberg Variations (Winter & Winter, 2000)

References

1944 births
2014 deaths
American jazz musicians
People from Mayagüez, Puerto Rico
Musicians from the Bronx
American Santeríans
Jazz musicians from New York (state)